Justin Burnette (born c. 1980) is an American former child actor, active between 1988 and 1998. He was nominated for the Young Artist Awards five times. He is the brother of actress Olivia Burnette.

Filmography

 1998 : Escape from Atlantis (TV) .... Adam Spencer
 1997 : Wings .... Spencer (episode : House of Blues)
 1996 : Chicago Hope .... David's Brother (episode : Women on the Verge)
 1995 : Jack Reed: One of Our Own (TV) .... John Reed Jr.
 1995 : Spring Fling! (TV) .... Teddy
 1994 : Jack Reed: A Search for Justice (TV) .... John Reed Jr.
 1994 : The Yarn Princess (TV) .... Mike
 1993 : Jack Reed: Badge of Honor (TV) .... John Reed Jr.
 1992–1993 : Hearts Afire .... Ben Hartman (semi-regular appearances)
 1992 : Major Dad .... Charlie (episode : Three's a Crowd)
 1991 : Dynasty: The Reunion (TV) .... Danny Carrington
 1991 : N.Y.P.D. Mounted (TV) .... Bob Coltrane
 1990-1991 : The Flash (TV) .... Shawn Allen
 1990 : Shattered Dreams (TV) .... Luke, age 9
 1989 : Empty Nest .... Eddie (episode : Just You and My Kid)
 1989 : Designing Women .... Harold Thomas (episode : Come on and Marry Me, Bill)
 1988–1989 : Dynasty .... Danny Carrington (#3)
 1988 : Disaster at Silo 7 (TV) .... T.J. Fitzgerald
 1988 : Take My Daughters, Please (TV) .... Jared

External links
 

American male child actors
Living people
1980s births
Year of birth uncertain